Field Day Rituals (released February 1, 2011 in Norway by the label Hubro Music – HUBRO CD 2520) is the fourth album of the Norwegian jazz band Splashgirl.

Reception 
The All About Jazz reviewer John Eyles awarded the album 4.5 stars, the reviewer Steven Johnson of Musicomh.com awarded the album 4 stars, and the reviewer Ben Hogwood of the British DMC World Magazine awarded the album 5 stars.

Track listing

Personnel 
 Jo Berger Myhre – double bass
 Andreas Lønmo Knudsrød – drums, percussion
 Andreas Stensland Løwe – piano, keyboards
 Timothy Mason – modular synth
 Eyvind Kang – viola

Credits 
 Arranged by Splashgirl
 With arrangements by Randall Dunn
 Designed by Yokoland
 Mastered by Jason Ward
 Photography by Aslak Gurholt Rønsen
 Recorded, mixed  and produced by Randall Dunn

Notes 
 Recorded, mixed and produced at Avast!, Seattle, WA, August 13–26, 2012
 Mastered by at Chicago Mastering Service
 Phonographic copyright (p) – Grappa Musikkforlag AS
 Copyright (c) – Grappa Musikkforlag AS

References

External links 

2013 albums